Novell Vibe is a web-based team collaboration platform developed by Novell, and was initially released by Novell in June 2008 under the name of Novell Teaming. Novell Vibe is a collaboration platform that can serve as a knowledge repository, document management system, project collaboration hub, process automation machine, corporate intranet or extranet. Users can upload, manage, comment on, and edit content in a secure manner. Supported content includes documents, calendars, discussion forums, wikis, blogs, tasks, and more.

Document management functionality allows for document versions, approvals, and document life cycle tracking. Users can download and modify pre-built custom web pages and workflows free of charge from the Vibe Resource Library.

As of 2022, Novell Vibe is now known as Micro Focus Vibe after the Novell acquisition.

History
Novell Vibe was created as the result of two Novell products, Teaming and Pulse, being merged into a single platform in 2010.

Novell Teaming began as SiteScape Forum. When Novell Acquired SiteScape in 2008, the name was changed to Novell Teaming.

Created in 2009, Novell Pulse was a communication tool based on the Google Wave Federation Protocol.

Compatibility

Server
Any combination of Linux and Windows servers can run the Vibe application. Furthermore, MySQL, MS SQL, and Oracle databases are also supported.

End-User operating systems
Windows, Linux, Mac, iOS or Android

Browsers
Firefox, Internet Explorer, Safari, or Chrome, Edge

Mobile
Any mobile device that has a browser can access the Vibe site. Native iOS and Android apps are available for free download in the app stores.

Microsoft Office integration
Word, PowerPoint, and Excel (versions 2013,2010 and 2007) on the Windows operating system are supported.

Interoperability
Vibe can be used in conjunction with various other software products, such as Novell Access Manager, Novell GroupWise, Skype, and YouTube. Novell Vibe integrates with an LDAP directory for authentication.

Extendibility
Vibe administrators can extend the Vibe software by creating software extensions, remote applications, or JAR (file format) files that enhance the power and usefulness of the Vibe software to create a custom experience for users.

Software extensions enable third-party developers to create abilities which extend an application. Vibe administrators or Vibe developers can create custom extensions (add-ons) to enhance Vibe. For example, you might have an extension that enables Flash video support in Vibe.

Remote applications
A remote application is a program that runs on a remote server and delivers data for use on the Novell Vibe site (such as data from a remote database). For example, Vibe administrators or Vibe developers could set up a remote application for Twitter that displays all of a user's Twitter entries in Vibe.

Unlike creating an extension for Vibe, creating a remote application does not modify the Vibe software.

Open-source solutions 
Not all of these projects implement all of the features Novell Vibe has to offer as well as Vibe is missing some features these products have:

 Kablink Vibe  an open source version of Novell Vibe
 Redmine/ChiliProject
 trac
 Feng Office Community Edition
 Open Workbench
 OpenProj
 Kune

see also: Wikipedia category for free project management software

References

External links
  Novell Vibe product page

Blog software
Electronic documents
Groupware
Instant messaging
Internet Protocol based network software
Novell software
Online chat
Proprietary wiki software
Social information processing